Can I Play That? is an American video game journalism website founded in 2018. A self-billed ‘game accessibility resource for both players and developers’, Can I Play That? specializes in providing accessibility reviews, features and news coverage on accessibility in games and the wider games industry. Can I Play That? also advocates for diversity and inclusion in games, and educates developers and studios about accessibility.

In addition to editorial pieces, Can I Play That? provides accessibility guidelines, and runs workshops on Diversity, Equity and Inclusion in Games and Accessible Community Management.

History 
Can I Play That? was founded in November 2018 by Susan Banks and Courtney Craven.  For five years prior, the couple co-hosted a Deaf / hard-of-hearing video game review site, OneOddGamerGirl.net, started in response to the lack of deaf accessibility in games such as Destiny. However, after repeatedly asking the question ‘Can I play that?’, the website was created to cater to the wider spectrum of gamers’ experiences and tackle inaccessibility in video games. The first game to receive a perfect score for accessibility from Can I Play That? was Gears 5, by The Coalition.

In January 2021, Can I Play That? announced two new collaborations as part of an initiative called Learn with CIPT: an Accessible Community Management workshop co-hosted by Courtney Craven and Stacey Jenkins, and a Diversity, Equity and Inclusion in Games workshop, co-hosted by Courtney Craven and Yi Shun Lai. Workshops have been delivered at studios such as Ubisoft and Splash Damage, and on July 19, 2021, Courtney co-hosted an Accessible Community Management summit with Stacey Jenkins at the Game Developers Conference 2021.

Staff 

 Susan Banks - co-founder (November 2018 - March 2019)
 Courtney Craven - co-founder and Director of Operations and Business Development (formerly Editor-in-Chief)
 Ben Bayliss - Editor-in-Chief
 Marijn (ActiveB1t) - Site Operations Manager
 Steve Saylor - Media Editor
 Grant Stoner - Editor (September 2019 - January 2021)

Contributors 
Can I Play That? accepts submissions from disabled gamers such as personal essays, commentary and features. In addition to the core staff members, regular contributors have included Stacey Jenkins, Antonio Martinez, Christy Smith Berman and Grant Stoner. Unlike other games journalism websites, Can I Play That? focuses specifically on accessibility in games, rather than content reviews. The site is run by and contributed to by disabled gamers, with contributors only reviewing the features they use themselves rather than speaking for other disabled gamers.

Recognition 

 Can I Play That? was awarded the 2020 Global Games Advocacy Award at the Women In Games Global Games Awards.
 In September 2019, co-founder Courtney Craven appeared on NPR's 1A podcast, together with Games Accessibility Specialist / Developer, Cherry Thompson.
 USA Today referenced the work of Grant Stoner, a mobility writer for Can I Play That?, in an article about accessibility in The Last of Us: Part II. The BBC and CNN interviewed Courtney Craven and Steve Saylor about accessibility options in the game.
 Resources by Can I Play That? have been highlighted by prominent game companies such as Microsoft.
 Can I Play That? contributor Grant Stoner was a member of the voting jury for the Game Awards 2020.

References 

Video game journalism
Gaming websites
Internet properties established in 2018
Video game websites
Game accessibility